Zavalla is a town (comuna) in the south of the province of Santa Fe, Argentina. It is located on National Route 33, immediately west of Pérez, 22 km south-west of the center of Rosario, and 187 km south of the provincial capital Santa Fe.

The settlement was born around a train station of the Ferrocarril Oeste Santafesino railway company, built in 1883 under the sponsorship of Carlos Casado del Alisal. The town proper was founded in 1887, and the local government institution (a support commission) was formally created on 21 July 1898. Its name is an homage to the priest and politician Manuel María Zavalla.

References
 
 

Populated places in Santa Fe Province